Augusto Ignácio do Espírito Santo Cardoso was a Brazilian general who was a primary commander during the Constitutionalist Revolution that served for the Second Brazilian Republic.

Biography
Augusto was the father of General Dulcídio do Espírito Santo Cardoso and Marshal Ciro do Espírito Santo Cardoso, he was brother of General Joaquim Ignácio Baptista Cardoso and great-uncle of former President Fernando Henrique Cardoso.

Afterwards, under the command of Major Marciano de Magalhães, he marched on foot to the neighborhood from Botafogo and, from there in donkey-drawn trams, to Campo de Santana, along with other companions to overthrow the Cabinet of the Viscount of Ouro Preto, following the Proclamation of the Republic in 1889. He was promoted to captain in 1906, major in 1912, lieutenant colonel in 1917 and to a full colonel in 1919. He was then given command of the 4th Cavalry Regiment and stationed at Rio Grande do Sul and Rio de Janeiro before the Tenente revolts broke out while he was at Três Corações and help quell the revolts and later took residence there.

He was then made Minister of War and Brigadier General by Getúlio Vargas, in the midst of the crisis that preceded the Constitutionalist Revolution of 1932, remaining in office until 1934.

Cardoso retired on July 1 1938, with about 44 years of service before dying at Rio de Janeiro on September 23, 1947.

References

1867 births
1947 deaths
Brazilian generals
People from Goiás
19th-century Brazilian military personnel
20th-century Brazilian military personnel
Vargas Era